New Worlds may refer to:

Publishing 
 New Worlds (magazine), a British science fiction magazine
 "New Worlds" (comics), a X-Men storyline by Grant Morrison
 New Worlds, an imprint of Caliber Comics

Music 
 New Worlds (album), an album by Charlotte Hatherley
 New Worlds, a song on the BBC Radiophonic Music compilation

Other uses 
 New Worlds (TV series), an historical drama
 New Worlds Mission, a NASA project
 New Worlds Project, a creative writing project
 Star Trek: New Worlds, a strategy game

See also
 New World (disambiguation)
 The New Worlds Fair, an album by Michael Moorcock and the Deep Fix